Eugene Ashley High School is a high school just outside Wilmington, North Carolina, located in the New Hanover County School District. The facility was opened in the New Hanover County Veteran's Park in 2001. The school was named after Medal of Honor recipient Sgt. Eugene Ashley, Jr., a native of Wilmington who died at age 37 in the battle of Lang Vei during the Vietnam War. As of the 2015–16 school year, it is 382 students over capacity.

Notable alumni
 Alex Highsmith, NFL outside linebacker
 Jack Stoker, Musician
 Trevor Kelley, MLB, Pitcher, Milwaukee Brewers

References

External links

Public high schools in North Carolina
Schools in New Hanover County, North Carolina
Schools in Wilmington, North Carolina
Educational institutions established in 2001
2001 establishments in North Carolina